Coach USA, LLC is a holding company for various American transportation service providers providing scheduled intercity bus service, local and commuter bus transit, city sightseeing, tour, yellow school bus, and charter bus service across the United States and Canada. It is owned by Variant Equity Advisors.

History
Coach USA traces its history back to 1922 as Lackawanna Bus and later Consolidated Bus Lines, a small outfit operating local service in Bergen County, New Jersey and later along the Jersey Shore and throughout the New York metropolitan area founded by Jim and Denis Gallagher. Community Coach, today the headquarters of Coach USA, began operations in 1958 under Denis's brother, John. The latter took over the operations of Consolidated Bus Lines, using the operating authority of another company that the Gallagher family had purchased in Paramus, New Jersey three years prior; through other acquisitions by the Gallagher family, six of these companies would become subsidiaries of Coach USA at its inception in 1995, when Frank Gallagher sold the firms to Notre Capital Ventures.

At its inception, Coach USA consisted of six companies: Suburban Trails, Community Coach, Leisure Line, and Adventure Trails in New Jersey, Gray Line of San Francisco and Arrow Stage Line in Arizona (not to be confused with unaffiliated Arrow Stage Lines). Listing on the NASDAQ in 1996 under ticker TOUR, and later switching to the New York Stock Exchange under stock ticker CUI, Coach USA, under the leadership of Richard Kristinik, would expand quickly, acquiring Progressive Transportation Services Inc. a contractor of municipal transit systems in Upstate New York. Coach USA acquired additional companies throughout the United States in the next three years to expand to over 5,000 buses and many more taxicabs, as its acquisitions also included yellow cab firms throughout the United States. During this time, the Gallagher family would start another company, Student Transportation of America, based in the area of its Coast Cities operation.

In 1998, Kristinik retired, and Larry King succeeded him. Stagecoach Group would purchase Coach USA in mid-1999 for $1.88 billion.

Under Stagecoach ownership and the helm of Frank Gallagher, the owner of its predecessors, Coach USA sought to continue expansion, but the company, hit hard by the loss of charter business after the September 11, 2001 attacks, caused Stagecoach to crash to a loss of over £524 million, at which point Stagecoach, having lost over 70 percent of its investment and now under the leadership of its founder, Brian Souter, after the downturn cost the previous CEO of Stagecoach his job, announced that all of the taxicab operations and most of Coach USA's subsidiaries were for sale, as Stagecoach sought to focus mostly on operations in the northeast, where Coach USA today maintains subsidized transit operations and scheduled service.

Retrenching, Stagecoach sold its companies in New England to Peter Pan Bus Lines. Companies in the Southwest, West, and Rocky Mountain regions were sold to KKR to form Coach America, and companies in the southeastern United States were sold to Lincolnshire Management, rebranded as American Coach Lines (which was merged with Coach America in 2006), all at heavy losses. The contract transit division (Progressive Transportation) was sold to competitor First Transit. As a result of the sale of most of Coach USA's operations, the company's headquarters were relocated from Texas to the Community Coach garage in Paramus, New Jersey. Eight of the sold companies would be reacquired when Coach America declared bankruptcy in 2012, along with Lakefront/Hopkins in Ohio, with the intent of expanding (and in the case of California, reintroducing) the Megabus brand.

Coach USA's operations today consist primarily of scheduled services in the New York and Chicago metropolitan areas, with a number of charter operations near Pittsburgh and scheduled operations in the Southern Tier of New York and southern Wisconsin, along with its Megabus operations throughout the eastern and central United States. In December 2018 Stagecoach announced it had agreed to sell all of its North American operations to Variant Equity Advisors subsidiary Project Kenwood Acquisition with the deal concluded in April 2019. Coach USA closed Chicago Trolley & Double Decker Co. in 2019. Coach USA closed Lakefront Lines in Ohio and Butler Motor Transit and Central Cab in Pennsylvania in 2020, due to the pandemic.

Operating companies
Coach USA includes the following local operating companies:

All West Coachlines (Sacramento, CA / Reno, NV)
American Coach Lines of Atlanta/Megabus Southeast (Atlanta, GA)
Coach Canada (Toronto, ON)
Coach Erie (Erie, PA)
Coach USA Airport Express (Waukesha, WI)
Coach USA Elko (Elko, NV)
Community Coach (Paramus, NJ)
Country Road Tours (Clarksburg, WV)
Dillon's Bus Service (Hanover, MD)
Gad-About Tours (Pittsburgh, PA)
Gray Line Montreal (Montreal, QC)
Gray Line New York Sightseeing (New York, NY)
Kerrville Bus Company/Megabus Southwest (San Antonio, TX)
Lenzner Coach Lines (Sewickley, PA)
Mountaineer Coach (Beaver, WV)
Olympia Trails/Megabus Northeast (Elizabeth, NJ)
Powder River Transportion (Gillette, WY)
Rockland Coaches (Westwood, NJ)
Short Line Bus (Chester, NY)
Pacific Coast Sightseeing Tour and Charters/Megabus West (Anaheim, CA)
Suburban Transit (New Brunswick, NJ)
Van Galder Bus Company (Janesville, WI)
Wisconsin Coach Lines (Waukesha, WI)

Megabus

Megabus is an intercity bus service providing discount travel services since 2006, operating throughout the eastern, southern, midwestern, and western United States and in the Canadian provinces of Ontario and Quebec. Megabus is notable for using curbside bus stops instead of traditional stations, low fares starting at $1, and in recent years, operating a point-to-point network of routes with buses making few stops en route to their destination.

See also
 Peter Pan Bus Lines – owner of former Coach USA New England Division
 Student Transportation of America – another company founded by the Gallagher family
 List of intercity bus stops in Wisconsin
 Number 22 Hillside LLC/Corp – A bus company in which Coach USA took over operations of.

References

External links

Megabus USA

 

Bus companies of the United States
Bus transportation in Illinois
Bus transportation in Wisconsin
Companies based in Bergen County, New Jersey
Transport companies established in 1995
Gray Line Worldwide
Intercity bus companies of the United States
 
Surface transportation in Greater New York
1995 establishments in the United States
Transportation companies based in New Jersey